Princess Natalia Bagration of Mukhrani (19 April 191426 August 1984), was a Georgian noblewoman of the House of Mukhrani.

Early life and ancestry
Princess Natalia was born in Pavlovsk Palace on 19 April 1914 and was a daughter of Prince Constantine Bagration of Mukhrani and Princess Tatiana Constantinovna of Russia. Princess Natasha was born into two prominent royal dynasties, the Georgian Bagrationi dynasty and the Russian House of Romanov. At her christening, her godfather was Emperor Nicholas II and his daughter Grand Duchess Olga. Due to her ancestry, she was related to British royal family, being second cousin of Prince Philip, Duke of Edinburgh, second cousin of Princess Marina, Duchess of Kent, and fourth cousin of Queen Elizabeth II.

Later life
After the Russian revolution, she and her family went to live in Yugoslavia. According to memoirs of Prince Tomislav of Yugoslavia, she was his first childhood crush.

Marriage
While working in London for the Yugoslav government-in-exile she met and later married British diplomat Sir Charles Johnston on 24 April 1945. Upon his being knighted in 1959, she became formally styled Lady Johnston. They had no children.

Death
She died on 26 August 1984 in London and was buried there at Gunnersbury Cemetery. She had a brother Prince Teymuraz Bagration-Mukhransky who lived in the United States.

Ancestry

References

1914 births
1984 deaths
House of Mukhrani
People from Yalta
White Russian emigrants to Yugoslavia
Yugoslav emigrants to the United Kingdom
Georgian people of Russian descent